Unisetosphaeria is a fungal genus in the family Trichosphaeriaceae. This is a monotypic genus, containing the single species Unisetosphaeria penguinoides, found on dead petioles and rhachides of the palms Eleiodoxa conferta and Nenga pumila in Sirindhorn Peat Swamp Forest, southern Thailand.

References

Trichosphaeriales
Monotypic Sordariomycetes genera